The AlphaTauri AT02 is a Formula One racing car designed and constructed by Scuderia AlphaTauri to compete in the 2021 Formula 1 World Championship. The car was driven by Yuki Tsunoda and Pierre Gasly. The AT02 is the second car to be built and run under the AlphaTauri name.

Complete Formula One results
(key)

Notes
 Driver failed to finish the race, but was classified as they had completed over 90% of the winner's race distance.
 Half points awarded as less than 75% of race distance completed.

References 

2021 Formula One season cars
AT02